Yuè is the Hanyu Pinyin transliteration of the Chinese family name 岳. In places which use the Wade-Giles romanization such as Taiwan, Yue is usually spelled as "Yüeh" or "Yueh".

Yuè is also the pinyin transliteration of the surname 樂 in traditional character and 乐 in simplified character. This name can also be read as Lè, which has a different origin.

Prominent individuals with the surname Yue 岳
Yue Hua (岳華) actor
Yue Fei (岳飛) military general who lived in the Southern Song dynasty
Yue Xin (activist) (岳昕) feminist and Marxist activist

Prominent individuals with the surname Yue 樂/乐
It is the 81st name on the Hundred Family Surnames poem.
Yue Jin (樂進) Military General who served under Warlord Cao Cao in the Late Han Dynasty
Yue Yi (樂毅) Minister of the states of Zhao and Yan in the Warring States era
Yue Guang (樂廣) Minister of West Jin during the Jin dynasty

References 

Chinese-language surnames
Multiple Chinese surnames